Andrija Marjanović (born January 14, 1999) is a Serbian professional basketball player for San Pablo Burgos of the Spanish LEB Oro.

Early life 
In June 2014, at 15 years of age, Marjanović moved to Barcelona, Spain where he played for FC Barcelona Lassa B. From 2015 to 2017, Marjanović played the Euroleague Basketball Next Generation Tournament for the FC Barcelona Lassa U18. In February 2017, Marjanović joined the Basketball Without Borders Global Camp in New Orleans, US.

Professional career 
On August 24, 2017, Marjanović signed a multi-year contract with Mega Bemax. He made his Adriatic League debut for Mega Bemax on October 4 in a game against the Crvena zvezda mts where he played 5 minutes without scoring. On start of 2017–18 KLS season he was loaned to Beovuk 72. On October 14, he made a debut for Beovuk 72 in a game against Vršac.

In July 2020, Marjanović signed a contract with Sloboda Užice. In October 2020, he joined Zlatibor. Marjanović signed with Metalac Valjevo in 2021 and averaged 13.1 points, 3.2 rebounds, and 2.3 assists per game. On March 16, 2022, he signed with KK Kumanovo of the Macedonian First League.

On August 8, 2022, he has signed with San Pablo Burgos of the LEB Oro.

National team career 
Marjanović was a member of the Serbian U-18 national basketball team that won the gold medal at the 2017 FIBA Europe Under-18 Championship. Over seven tournament games, he averaged 6 points, 3 rebounds and 0.9 assists per game. He was a member of the Serbian U-16 national basketball team which participate at the 2014 and 2015 FIBA Europe Under-16 Championship. Over nine 2015 tournament games, he averaged 14.1 points, 3.2 rebounds and 1.1 assists per game. Marjanović was a member of the Serbian under-20 team that finished 15th at the 2019 FIBA U20 European Championship in Tel Aviv, Israel. Over seven tournament games, he averaged 7.1 points, 1.9 rebounds, and 0.9 assists per game.

References

External links 
 Profile at eurobasket.com
 Profile at realgm.com
  Profile at draftexpress.com

1999 births
Living people
ABA League players
Basketball League of Serbia players
CB Miraflores players
KK Beovuk 72 players
KK Mega Basket players
KK Metalac Valjevo players
KK Sloboda Užice players
KK Zlatibor players
FC Barcelona Bàsquet B players
Serbian men's basketball players
Serbian expatriate basketball people in North Macedonia
Serbian expatriate basketball people in Spain
Basketball players from Niš
Small forwards
Shooting guards